The specific weight, also known as the unit weight, is the weight per unit volume of a material.

Often a source of confusion is that the terms specific gravity, and less often specific weight, are also used for relative density.

Definition
The specific weight, of a material is defined as the product of its density, and the standard gravity, : 

The density of the material is defined as mass per unit volume, typically measured in kg/m3.

Unlike density, specific weight is not a fixed property of a material. It depends on the value of the gravitational acceleration, which varies with location. Pressure may also affect values, depending upon the bulk modulus of the material, but generally, at moderate pressures, has a less significant effect than the other factors.

Applications

Fluid mechanics
In fluid mechanics, specific weight represents the force exerted by gravity on a unit volume of a fluid.  For this reason, units are expressed as force per unit volume (e.g., N/m3 or lbf/ft3).  Specific weight can be used as a characteristic property of a fluid.

Soil mechanics
Specific weight is often used as a property of soil to solve earthwork problems.

In soil mechanics, specific weight may refer to:

Civil and mechanical engineering
Specific weight can be used in civil engineering and mechanical engineering to determine the weight of a structure designed to carry certain loads while remaining intact and remaining within limits regarding deformation.

Specific weight of water

Specific weight of air

References

External links
 Water Weights & Weight Belts (Arrow Weights Manufacturing)
 Specific weight calculator
 http://www.engineeringtoolbox.com/density-specific-weight-gravity-d_290.html
 http://www.themeter.net/pesi-spec_e.htm

Soil mechanics
Fluid mechanics
Physical chemistry
Physical quantities
Density